Jacques-Noël Sané (18 February 1740, Brest – 22 August 1831, Paris) was a French naval engineer. He was the creator of standardised designs for ships of the line and frigates fielded by the French Navy in the 1780s, which served during the French Revolutionary Wars and the Napoleonic Wars and in some cases remained in service into the 1860s. Captured ships of his design were commissioned in the Royal Navy and even copied.

His achievements earned Sané the nickname of "naval Vauban."

Biography 
Born in Brest in a family of sailors, Sané became a student engineer in 1758 and joined the naval construction academy in Paris in 1765, graduating On 1 October 1766 as an assistant engineer. In 1767, he worked under Ollivier the Elder on naval ships, and with Antoine Choquet de Lindu on merchant ships. In 1769, he embarked on the fluyt , bound for Martinique with four scows and a dredger of his design.

He then worked on several 12-pounder frigates. During the War of American Independence, Navy minister Sartine, his successor Castries, and engineer Borda requested standard plans to standardise the production of 18-pounder frigates (equivalent to the British fifth-rate), 74-gun ships of the line (equivalent to the British third-rate), 80-gun two-deckers (without equivalent: similar to a third-rate, but longer than a second-rate and with comparable firepower), and 118-gun three-deckers (equivalent to the British first-rate). Sané won three successive competitions:
 in 1782, his  was selected for the 74-guns
 in 1785, his  was selected for the 118-guns
 in 1787, his  was later selected for the 80-guns

In 1784, Sané had his only child, Amélie Fanny Gabrielle; she would later marry Captain Delarue de la Gréardière, and die in December 1812.

On 18 June 1787, Sané joined the Académie de Marine. In 1789, he was promoted to sub-director of naval constructions.

He was made a member of the French Academy of Sciences in 1796, and naval construction inspector on 7 July 1798, responsible for the coast of the Atlantic and of the English Channel; his duty comprised inspection of the harbours and selection of timbers from the forests in the Pyrenees.

In 1800, Sané was made General inspector for naval engineering, an office he would retain until 1817. In 1807, Sané designed a type of corvette that remained in service until the end of the sailing navy. The same year, Napoléon required a collection of accurate ship models to document the French Navy; Denis Decrès tasked Sané with the project, known as the Trianon model collection, for which 13 models were specially created and 6 others collected and upgraded.

His plans for 18-pounder frigates were adopted in 1810; the same year, he was made a Baron of Empire.

Under the Restoration, Sané was awarded the Order of Saint Michael. In 1820, aged 80, he was made president of the Commission de Paris, although he never involved himself in the upcoming steamship revolution. The first steamer of the French Navy, entered service in 1829.

Sané died in Paris on 22 August 1831, aged 91.

Work 
Sané was responsible for 
 9 118-gun ships of the line of the Océan class
 5 110-gun ships of the 
 27 80-guns of the Tonnant and  classes
 107 74-guns of the Annibal and Téméraire classes, between 1783 and as late as 1841
 65 18-pounder frigates of the Hébé,  and  classes, built between 1781 and 1814.

Legacy 

Three ships of the French Navy have been named Sané after Jacques-Noël Sané. The class of 2004 of the École nationale supérieure de techniques avancées Bretagne was named in his honour.

Sources and references

Notes

References

Sources 
 

 
 

1740 births
1831 deaths
French Navy officers from Brest, France
French naval architects